"I Will Be There" is a song featured on  Northern Irish singer/songwriter Van Morrison's sixth album Saint Dominic's Preview (1972). The song is also the B-side to Morrison's single "Warm Love", released in 1973.

Recording and composition
"I Will Be There" was recorded in April 1972 at the Wally Heider Studios in San Francisco, along with "Saint Dominic's Preview" and "Redwood Tree". It is one of few overtly jazz songs written by Morrison, and the first since the release of "Moondance" in 1970. The song is led in by Tom Salisbury on piano, who also arranged the three songs from the session. Salisbury explained his contribution to the song:"I wrote the horn chart." "It was written with simple triads as the chords. We ran over that one ahead of the session and Doug Messenger expanded the progression by using four- and five-part jazz chords: G7(9), F(9,6,flat5), E7#9, etc." Also featured in the song is a saxophone solo from long serving Jack Schroer. The other members of the band used for the session were Doug Messenger on guitar, Bill Church on bass, Gary Mallaber on drums and Jules Broussard on saxophone.

Writing
The lyrics are the most lighthearted of the songs on Saint Dominic's Preview, with the singer grabbing his razor, suitcase, toothbrush, overcoat and underwear, sung in quick succession in a break in the music. Peter Wrench notes that "The words tumble over themselves in a joyful jumble: they shouldn’t quite fit the beat but they do." Wrench believes that it is not a song that Morrison refined lyrically, citing the line "Try not to be through the mill" as an example.

Reception
John Collis says, "A hero (of Van), is evoked by the piano-led blues "I Will Be There" - the spirit of Ray Charles looms large in the song." The Rolling Stone review of Saint Dominic's Preview remarks: "'I Will Be There' goes the furthest of any (of the songs in Saint Dominic's Preview) into R&B-jazz roots, as Van pays expert musical tribute to Count Basie and Joe Williams."

Live performances
The first known performance of "I Will Be There", which is likely to be the first time the song was performed, was on April 27, 1972.

It was one of the live performances recorded and included on Morrison's 1996 live album, How Long Has This Been Going On. A live performance of "I Will Be There", recorded in 1989, is featured on the video album, Van Morrison The Concert, released in 1990.

Personnel
Van Morrison: vocals
Jules Broussard: tenor saxophone
Bill Church: bass
Gary Mallaber: drums
Doug Messenger: guitar
Tom Salisbury: piano
Jack Schroer: alto saxophone

Covers
Colin James on Colin James & The Little Big Band 3
Pee Wee Ellis with Van Morrison

Notes

References
Album notes for Saint Dominic's Preview by Van Morrison. Warner Bros. Records.
Collis, John (1996). Inarticulate Speech of the Heart, Little Brown and Company, 
Mills, Peter (2010), Hymns to the Silence: Inside the Words and Music of Van Morrison, London: Continuum, 
Wrench, Peter (2012). Saint Dominic's Flashback: Van Morrison's Classic Album, Forty Years On, FeedARead. Kindle Edition. 

1972 songs
Van Morrison songs
Songs written by Van Morrison
Song recordings produced by Ted Templeman
Song recordings produced by Van Morrison